POST Luxembourg, formerly known as Entreprise des Postes et Télécommunications, is a mail and telecommunications company based in Luxembourg. The company is a government-owned corporation, which originated from Luxembourg's state-owned PTT agency founded in 1842, and was subsequently corporatised in 1992. It also sells financial services and holds a monopoly on issuing postage stamps in the Grand Duchy.

It comes under the remit of the Minister for Communications, who reports to the Prime Minister in the latter's capacity as Minister of State.

P&T owns shares in sixteen other companies, including controlling stakes in eBRC data centres (100%), Editus.lu (100%), Eltrona, HotCity, Infomail (45%), Intech, Michel Greco (60%), Netcore (100%), POST Telecom (100%), POST PSF Consulting (100%), Victor Buck Services (Majority), Visual Online (51%).

On September 30, 2013, P&TLuxembourg and LuxGSM merged into a single brand, POST Luxembourg. The LUXGSM network was therefore renamed POST.

Footnotes

Telecommunications companies of Luxembourg
Government-owned companies of Luxembourg
Companies based in Luxembourg City
Luxembourg
Telecommunications companies established in 1992
Postal system of Luxembourg
Philately of Luxembourg
1992 establishments in Luxembourg